The 1987 Texas A&M Aggies softball team represented Texas A&M University in the 1987 NCAA Division I softball season.  The Aggies were coached by Bob Brock, who led his sixth season at Texas A&M.  The Aggies finished with a record of 56–8.

The Aggies were invited to the 1987 NCAA Division I softball tournament, where they swept the Central Regional and then completed a run through the Women's College World Series to claim the NCAA Women's College World Series Championship for the second time.  Texas A&M had won the 1983 Women's College World Series and the 1982 AIAW Women's College World Series, and did not participate in the 1982 NCAA Women's College World Series.

Roster

Schedule

References

Texas AandM
Texas A&M Aggies softball seasons
Texas AandM Softball
Women's College World Series seasons
NCAA Division I softball tournament seasons